Tha Rae (or spelled: Tharae and Thare;), also known as Ban Tha Rae, is a tambon (sub-district) and community of Mueang Sakon Nakhon District, Sakon Nakhon Province, northeastern Thailand (Isan).

History
Tha Rae was founded in 1884 by a French missionary named Xavier Guego, who evacuated his family from downtown Sakon Nakhon across Nong Han Lake to set up a new residence on the northern shore of Nong Han. They founded a Roman Catholic church called "St Michael's Cathedral". The first people who settled in Tha Rae, there are about 10 households of Vietnamese Christian immigrant and 10 households of native Isan, totaling more than 20 households, and currently has 2,200 households.

That is why Tha Rae is the largest Catholic community in Thailand. It is governed by Roman Catholic Archdiocese of Thare and Nonseng.

Moreover, specially in the past,  Tha Rae was notorious for being a trading centre for dog meat exported to neighbouring countries, including local consumption. But from the insistence of local people that at present, the trade of dog and popular consumption of dog meat has decreased considerably.

Nowadays, Tha Rae regarded as the old town zone of Sakon Nakhon, along the main street there are still old colonial buildings standing.

Geography
Tha Rae is about 21 km (13 mi) from downtown Sakon Nakhon via Sakon Nakhon–Nakhon Phanom Highway, 14 km (8 mi) from Sakon Nakhon Airport.

Neighbouring sub-districts are (from north clockwise): Na Phiang in Kusuman District, Na Kaeo in Phon Na Kaeo District, Nong Lat in its district, and Chiang Khruea in its district.

The landscape of Tha Rae is a rural–urban fringe. Each  muban (village) is not far away from each other, but there are some villages that are about 1 km (about 1093 yd) away. Most of the area is lowland alongside the lake of Nong Han.

Economy
Most Tha Rae residents work in rice cultivation. Nong Han freshwater fishing and fruit farming are fallbacks.

Administration
Tha Rae is administered by the local government, subdistrict-municipality Tha Rae (เทศบาลตำบลท่าแร่).

Tha Rae is also divided into eight administrative villages.

Places
St Michael's Cathedral, Tha Rae
Old colonial buildings

Local tradition
Due to being the largest Catholic community in Thailand, therefore, Tha Rae has a local tradition that is unique and the only one in the world. "Tha Rae Star Procession" is a tradition to celebrate the Christmas every year. They will have Christmas star parade along the road from Tha Rae to other areas in Mueang Sakon Nakhon, since they believe star (Star of Bethlehem) is the symbol of Jesus of Nazareth. The parade is decorated with big stars and electric lightings. It reflects Christians' belief that Jesus was born on human world. Every year, there are around 200 star parades. This festival has been held continuously for over 100 years every night on December 24 (Christmas Eve). It has built a great reputation for Tha Rae.

See also
Catholic Church in Thailand

References

Tambon of Sakon Nakhon Province